The  Isle of Thanet Electric Tramways and Lighting Company operated a tramway service between Margate and Ramsgate between 1901 and 1937.

History

Services started on 4 April 1901 on a route which ran from Canterbury Road, Margate, via Cliftonville, High Street Broadstairs, Dumpton Park Drive, to a terminus at Ramsgate Town railway station.

Electric power was supplied by Thanet power station adjacent to the tram depot.

Fleet

The initial livery was maroon and cream.
1-40 St. Louis Car Company 1901. 
41-50 G.F. Milnes & Co. 1901
51-60 British Electric Car Company 1903

Accidents

On 27 May 1905 car 47 failed to take a bend and came off the tracks into a grocer's shop in Bellevue Road, Ramsgate, seriously
injuring the driver, conductor and the grocer's 7-year-old daughter.

On 3 August 1905, car 41, during a routine descent of the precipitous, and adverse camber leading down Madeira Walk hill into Ramsgate harbour, suddenly careered out of control, jumping the tracks, causing it to crash straight through the railings, so that it then dropped over the  cliff edge adjacent. Providentially, only a few passengers were travelling on car 41 that day, and they came out of the ordeal unscathed, but the driver, who was new to the job, sustained some injury.

Closure

The tramway service closed on 27 March 1937 but the company continued to supply electrical power to the district for domestic and commercial consumption.

References

External links
 Margate Museum Factsheet: The Isle of Thanet Tramway System 1901–1937
 Isle of Thanet Electric Tramways at the British Tramway Company Badges and Buttons website

Tram transport in England
Margate
Ramsgate
3 ft 6 in gauge railways in England